Thomas Joseph McDonough (December 5, 1911 – August 4, 1998) was an American prelate of the Roman Catholic Church. He served as an auxiliary bishop of the Diocese of St. Augustine in Florida (1947–1957), as auxiliary bishop and bishop of the Diocese of Savannah in Georgia (1957–1967) and as archbishop of the Archdiocese of Louisville in Kentucky (1967–1981).

Biography

Early life and ministry
Thomas McDonough was born on December 5, 1911, in Philadelphia, Pennsylvania, to Michael Francis and Mary Margaret (Nolan) McDonough. After graduating from West Philadelphia Catholic High School, he studied at St. Charles Borromeo Seminary in Wynnewood, Pennsylvania. 

McDonough was ordained to the priesthood for the Diocese of Greensburg by Bishop Hugh L. Lamb on May 26, 1938. In 1941, McDonough earned a Doctor of Canon Law degree from The Catholic University of America in Washington, D.C. 

McDonough was incardinated, or transferred, in 1941 to the Diocese of St. Augustine, where he served as pastor of St. Joseph's Parish in Jacksonville, Florida (1942–1943) and rector of the Cathedral of St. Augustine in St. Augustine, Florida (1943–1945). He also served as chancellor (1944–1947) and vicar general (1947–1957) of the diocese. McDonough then served as pastor of St. Paul's Parish in Jacksonville Beach, Florida.

Auxiliary Bishop of St. Augustine
On March 10, 1947, McDonough was appointed auxiliary bishop of the Diocese of St. Augustine and titular bishop of Thenae by Pope Pius XII. He received his episcopal consecration on April 30, 1947, from Cardinal Dennis Dougherty, with Bishops Emmet M. Walsh and J. Carroll McCormick serving as co-consecrators. At age 35, McDonough was then the youngest member of the American hierarchy. During his tenure as an auxiliary bishop, he was responsible for much land purchasing, fund-raising, church building, and work with African Americans.

Bishop of Savannah
Pope John XXIII appointed McDonough as an auxiliary bishop of the Diocese of Savannah on January 2, 1957.  He succeeded Bishop Gerald O'Hara as the tenth bishop of Savannah on March 2, 1960. McDonough attended the Second Vatican Council in Rome from 1962 to 1965 during the American Civil Rights Movement.  He signed the "Pentecost Statement" of the bishops of the Atlanta Province, condemning racial discrimination as contrary to Christian principles.

Archbishop of Louisville
Pope Paul VI appointed McDonough as archbishop of the Archdiocese of Louisville on March 1, 1967. A self-described "Vatican II bishop," McDonough implemented the Second Vatican Council's reforms and guided the archdiocese through an intensive period of activity and change. His tenure saw advances in liturgical renewal, ecumenism, and lay involvement.

Retirement 
On September 29, 1981, Pope John Paul II accepted McDonough's resignation as Archbishop of Louisville. Thomas McDonough died on August 4, 1998 in Darby, Pennsylvania, at age 86. He is buried at Calvary Cemetery in Louisville.

Viewpoints

Roe v. Wade 
On January 22, 1973, when the U.S. Supreme Court issued the Roe v. Wade decision legalizing abortion, McDonough issued a statement calling the day "Blue Monday" and saying that it was "...overtly a violation of individual rights. It comes at a time too when efforts have been made to close down the war in Vietnam and to save the lives of all the people who have been endangered by that war. Now we hear the highest court in the land has declared an assault upon the life of the unborn child."

See also

 Catholic Church hierarchy
 Catholic Church in the United States
 Historical list of the Catholic bishops of the United States
 List of Catholic bishops of the United States
 Lists of patriarchs, archbishops, and bishops

References

External links
Roman Catholic Archdiocese of Louisville
Roman Catholic Diocese of Savannah
Roman Catholic Diocese of St. Augustine

1911 births
1998 deaths
Clergy from Philadelphia
St. Charles Borromeo Seminary alumni
Catholic University of America alumni
Participants in the Second Vatican Council
Roman Catholic Archdiocese of Louisville
20th-century Roman Catholic archbishops in the United States
Roman Catholic bishops of Savannah, Georgia
Religious leaders from Kentucky